Bentarique is a municipality of Almería province, in the autonomous community of Andalusia, Spain.

Demographics

References

External links
  Bentarique - Sistema de Información Multiterritorial de Andalucía
  Bentarique - Diputación Provincial de Almería

Municipalities in the Province of Almería